Tapeina erectifrons is a species of beetle in the family Cerambycidae. It was described by James Thomson in 1857. It is known from Peru, French Guiana, Colombia, Brazil, and Venezuela.

Subspecies
 Tapeina erectifrons erectifrons Thomson, 1857
 Tapeina erectifrons avuncula Marinoni, 1972
 Tapeina erectifrons amazona Marinoni, 1972

References

Lamiinae
Beetles described in 1857